This is a list of episodes for the second season of Nickelodeon's animated television series, Kung Fu Panda: Legends of Awesomeness. The first episode, a sneak peek, aired on April 6, 2012, and the regular run began airing September 26, 2012.

Episodes

DVD releases

References

2012 American television seasons
2013 American television seasons